Noritoshi (written: , , ,  or ) is a masculine Japanese given name. Notable people with the name include:

, Japanese sociologist
, Japanese photographer
, Japanese gymnast
, Japanese politician
, Japanese businessman

Japanese masculine given names